These are the Billboard magazine number-one albums of 1994, per the Billboard 200.

Chart history

See also
1994 in music
List of number-one albums (United States)

References

1994
1994 record charts